Topeka station is a train station in Topeka, Kansas, United States, served by Amtrak's Southwest Chief train. The station was built in 1948 by the Atchison, Topeka and Santa Fe Railway as a replacement for the former Topeka Harvey House, which itself was opened in 1878 as part of the original Santa Fe depot and remained open until 1940. The existing station was remodeled by the BNSF Railway in 2006. From 2015 to 2019 the station has been, on average, the second-most-frequented Amtrak station in Kansas; however, in 2019 it fell behind Lawrence into third place.

See also 
List of Amtrak stations

References

External links

Topeka Amtrak Station (USA Rail Guide -- Train Web)

Amtrak stations in Kansas
Atchison, Topeka and Santa Fe Railway stations
Union Pacific Railroad stations
Buildings and structures in Topeka, Kansas
Railway stations in the United States opened in 1950
1950 establishments in Kansas